The second season of the reality television series Black Ink Crew aired on VH1 from September 23, 2013 until April 28, 2014. It chronicles the daily operations and staff drama at an African American-owned and operated tattoo shop in Harlem, New York.

Cast

Main
Ceaser Emanuel
Dutchess Lattimore
O'Shit Duncan
Puma Robinson
Sassy Bermudez
Alex Estevez
Sky Days (episode 14-18)

Recurring
Ted Ruks
Walt Miller
Quani Robinson
Kathie Arseno
Tiffany Winter

Episodes

References

2013 American television seasons
2014 American television seasons
Black Ink Crew